Monkwearmouth is an area of Sunderland, Tyne and Wear in North East England. Monkwearmouth is located at the north side of the mouth of the River Wear. It was one of the three original settlements on the banks of the River Wear along with Bishopwearmouth and Sunderland, the area now known as the East End. It includes the area around St. Peter's Church, founded in 674 as part of Monkwearmouth-Jarrow Abbey, and was once the main centre of Wearside shipbuilding and coalmining in the town. It is now host to a campus of the University of Sunderland and the National Glass Centre.  It is served by the three Church of England churches of the Parish of Monkwearmouth. The first nineteenth-century Catholic church built in Monkwearmouth was St Benet's Church which remains active today.

Monkwearmouth is across the river from the Port of Sunderland at Sunderland Docks.

The locals of the area were called "Barbary Coasters". The borough stretches from Wearmouth Bridge to the harbour mouth on the north side of the river and is one of the oldest parts of Sunderland.

The former railway station, closed in 1968 by the Beeching Axe, is now the Monkwearmouth Station Museum and features a restored booking office dating from the Edwardian period. Since 2002, Monkwearmouth has once again been served by rail transport, this time via St Peter's Tyne and Wear Metro station a few hundred metres south of the old station.

Wearmouth Colliery, a coal mine, was closed in December 1993 after it had been in operation for over 100 years. The site is now the home of the Stadium of Light, which opened in July 1997 and is the home of the football club Sunderland A.F.C., who had previously played at Roker Park.

Monkwearmouth was part of the Sunderland North parliamentary constituency for elections to the House of Commons of the United Kingdom. Monkwearmouth is now part of Sunderland Central.

References

City of Sunderland suburbs
Sunderland
Tyne and Wear
City of Sunderland